Amund Rydland (25 November 1888 – 16 February 1967) was a Norwegian stage and film actor and theatre director.

Born in the village of Alversund, Lindås municipality in Hordaland, he made his stage debut at Det Norske Teatret in 1913, and served as the theatre's director from 1916 to 1922. He was best known for his comedy characters.

Selected filmography
Growth of the Soil (1921)
Farende folk (1922)
Himmeluret (1925)
Ugler i mosen (1959)

References

External links

1888 births
1967 deaths
Norwegian male stage actors
Norwegian male film actors
Norwegian male silent film actors
20th-century Norwegian male actors
Norwegian theatre directors
People from Lindås
People from Nordhordland